The Road We've Traveled is a 2012 documentary film about the events of Barack Obama's presidency. Directed by Davis Guggenheim, the documentary was produced by Obama's re-election campaign and was narrated by Tom Hanks.

The film
Events detailed in the film include the economic crisis, health care reform, the auto industry bailout, and the Navy Seal mission that led to the death of al-Qaeda leader Osama bin Laden.

People interviewed in the film include Vice President Joe Biden, Obama political aide David Axelrod, consumer advocate and former chairwoman of the Congressional Oversight Panel for TARP Elizabeth Warren and former chief of staff and current Mayor of Chicago Rahm Emanuel.

Reception
The New York Times noted the use of social media to reach voters instead of television advertisements. New York Times reviewer Alessandra Stanley said that some critics of the video were "inane", noting that "Presidential candidates have been starring in self-promoting campaign videos since Eisenhower". Stanley also noted that the video focuses more on the "apocalyptic" scenarios averted, saying "It's not morning yet on "The Road We've Traveled." It's the end of the darkest hour of the night." The Washington Post referred to the film as a "masterful stroke", comparing it to a similar film made by Bill Clinton during the 1992 campaign. The reviewer wrote, "It's less of a bragging moment and more like a contractor's bid for renewal".

CNN host Piers Morgan, in an interview with director Davis Guggenheim, was critical of the fact that the film cast Obama in an overly positive light and did not have a more balanced analysis. Liberal commentator Glenn Greenwald wrote that the film, and Guggenheim's subsequent media appearance, displayed "creepy leader worship" and that Guggenheim epitomized the "pure face of the Authoritarian Mind".

References

External links
Film page at BarackObama.com
 

Films directed by Davis Guggenheim
Barack Obama 2012 presidential campaign
Presidency of Barack Obama
2012 films
American short documentary films
2012 short documentary films
Documentary films about presidents of the United States
Films about Barack Obama
2012 United States presidential election in popular culture
Films scored by Christophe Beck
Films scored by Jake Monaco
2010s English-language films
2010s American films